Pandelleia is a genus of parasitic flies in the family Tachinidae.

Species
Pandelleia albipennis Villeneuve, 1934
Pandelleia dimorphia (Curran, 1939)
Pandelleia ornata (Rohdendorf, 1923)
Pandelleia otiorrhynchi Villeneuve, 1922
Pandelleia pilicauda (Mesnil, 1975)
Pandelleia pschorni Mesnil, 1963
Pandelleia sexpunctata (Pandellé, 1896)
Pandelleia translucens (Mesnil, 1959)

References

Dexiinae
Taxa named by Joseph Villeneuve de Janti
Tachinidae genera
Diptera of Europe
Diptera of Africa
Diptera of Asia